The Archdeacon of Bedford is an ecclesiastical post in the Church of England Diocese of St Albans in the Province of Canterbury. Historically the post was in the Diocese of Lincoln, then from 1837 in the Diocese of Ely, England. On 13 April 1914, the archdeaconry became a part of the Diocese of St Albans. The present holder of the office is Dave Middlebrook, collated Archdeacon on 30 March 2019.

Seal
The 12/13th c. brass seal-matrix of the Archdeacon of Bedford was found in South Lincolnshire in 2003 by a metal detectorist, in almost perfect condition. It displays a legend in Latin: SIGILLUM ARCHIDIACONI BEDEFORDI(A)E ("Seal of the Archdeacon of Bedford"). Of two heraldic shields, that shown at dexter displays the arms of Cantilupe (modern): Gules, three leopard's faces jessant-de-lys or, as used by Saint Thomas de Cantilupe (d.1282), Bishop of Hereford, and later adopted as the arms of the See of Hereford. The reason for the use of the Cantilupe arms on the seal is unclear, the surviving (but incomplete) list of Archdeacons of Bedford does not include a member of the Cantilupe family. The office of Archdeacon of Bedford had no connection with the See of Hereford and is known to have been under the control of the See of Lincoln, hence a possible reason for the location the object was found in. The Cantilupe family were feudal barons of Eaton (Bray) in Bedfordshire and were seated (amongst many other places) at Eaton Castle, near Dunstable, not too far from the town of Bedford. A junior branch (see Baron Cantilupe) was seated at Greasley Castle in Nottingham and at Withcall in Lincolnshire, in which county they were prominent. Nicholas de Cantilupe, 3rd Baron Cantilupe (c.1301–1355) of Greasley founded the Cantilupe Chantry in Lincoln Cathedral and was buried in the Cathedral where survives his mutilated recumbent effigy. However the armorials of the Greasley branch include a fess vair, not shown on the seal. The style of the seal with the gothic architectural elements date it to the 13/14th. centuries.  Measurements: 32 mm x 51 mm; weight 2.5 g.

List of archdeacons

High Medieval
bef. May 1092?: Osbert
Ralph
bef. 1129aft. 1141: Hugh
bef. 1145aft. 1175 (d.): Nicholas
aft. 1198: Alan
bef. 1199aft. 1203: Richard
aft. 1203: Geoffrey
bef. 12061218 (d.): Alexander of Elstow
12181231 (res.): John de Houton (afterwards Archdeacon of Northampton)
1231 (d?): Amaury of Buckden
1246 (res.): John de Dyham
bef. 12541260 (d.): John of Crakehall
1260–1268: Peter de Audeham
1268January 1273: John de Maidenstan (afterwards Archdeacon of Oxford)
bef. 1275: Nicholas de Hegham (afterwards Archdeacon of Oxford)
bef. 1280October 1282 (d.): Richard de Bradewell
1282–1291: John Hook
?: Stephen Gardiner?
30 December 129110 September 1319: Roger Rothwell/Rowell (deprived)

Late Medieval
10 September 131926 January 1230: Thomas Neville (set aside)
26 January 13201333 (d.): Edmund London
1333–?: John Daubeny
?30 August 1351 (exch.): Philip Daubeny
30 August 1351bef. 1372: Thomas Cumpton
bef. 1372bef. 1375: John Irtlingburgh
bef. 13751405 (d.): Thomas Stowe
19 November 14051423 (d.): William Aghton
17 April 14231431 (res.): Richard Caudray (afterwards Archdeacon of Lincoln)
14311439 (d.): William Derby
14 February 14391450 (d.): Robert Thornton
21 May 14501460 (d.): Thomas Salisbury
15 December 14601468 (res.): John Rudying (afterwards Archdeacon of Northampton)
4 December 14681471 (res.): John Collinson (afterwards Archdeacon of Northampton)
6 Auguster 1471bef. April 1489 (res.): Henry Sharp
April 14891494 (res.): Thomas Hutton (afterwards Archdeacon of Huntingdon)
17 February 14941525 (d.): William Cosyn
11 January 15251549 (d.): John Chambre

Early modern
7 July 15491554 (res.): Gilbert Bourne
1 May 155411 November 1558 (d.): John Pope
15 November 1558February 1559 (d.): Michael Dunning (deprived)
14 March 15591560 (res.): Richard Barber (afterwards Archdeacon of Leicester)
24 December 15601574 (d.): William Todd
31 May 15741598 (d.): John Robinson
14 March 15986 December 1599 (res.): Roger Parker
4 February 16001631 (d.): George Eland
4 October 16311661 (res.): John Hacket (afterwards Bishop of Lichfield and Coventry, 1661)
May 166216 July 1667 (d.): Francis Wilford
August 166722 November 1678 (d.): Theophilus Dillingham
15 February 16793 April 1704 (d.): John Skelton
April 17042 March 1731 (d.): Thomas Frank
22 May 17311745 (d.): John Dudley
15 March 17451756 (res.): John Taylor (afterwards Archdeacon of Leicester)
16 July 17561757 (res.): Charles Jenner (afterwards Archdeacon of Huntingdon)
28 April 175728 February 1771 (d.): Richard Grey
20 March 17711782 (d.): Hadley Cox
18 May 17821 June 1783 (d.): William Done
19 June 17833 January 1809 (d.): Richard Shepherd
12 January 18091821 (d.): Samuel Vince
10 December 18211845 (res.): Henry Bonney
The archdeaconry was transferred from the diocese of Lincoln to the diocese of Ely by Order-in-Council on 30 May 1837
12 March 184529 June 1866 (res.): Henry Tattam

Late modern
186631 January 1873 (d.): Henry Rose
187323 September 1910 (d.): Frederick Bathurst
19101914 (res.): Noel Hodges (also assistant bishop)
Since the diocese's erection on 13 April 1914, the Archdeaconry of Bedford has been part of the Diocese of St Albans
19241933 (res.): Arthur Parnell
193314 November 1934 (d.): Gerard Lander (also Assistant Bishop of St Albans; former Bishop of Victoria)
19351945 (ret.): William Robins
19461955 (res.): Donald Harris
19561958 (res.): Basil Guy (also Bishop suffragan of Bedford from 1957)
19581962 (res.): Basil Snell
19621973 (res.): John Hare (also Bishop suffragan of Bedford from 1968)
19741979 (ret.): Robert Brown
19791985 (res.): Christopher Mayfield
19861993 (res.): Michael Bourke
19932003 (ret.): Malcolm Lesiter (archdeacon emeritus since retirement)
September 200331 December 2018 (ret.): Paul Hughes (afterwards archdeacon emeritus)
30 March 2019present: Dave Middlebrook

References

Sources

Bedfordshire County Council page

Lists of Anglicans
 
Lists of English people
Diocese of St Albans